In applied mathematics, discontinuous Galerkin methods (DG methods) form a class of numerical methods for solving differential equations. They combine features of the finite element and the finite volume framework and have been successfully applied to hyperbolic, elliptic, parabolic and mixed form problems arising from a wide range of applications. DG methods have in particular received considerable interest for problems with a dominant first-order part, e.g. in electrodynamics, fluid mechanics and plasma physics.

Discontinuous Galerkin methods were first proposed and analyzed in the early 1970s as a technique to numerically solve partial differential equations. In 1973 Reed and Hill introduced a DG method to solve the hyperbolic neutron transport equation.

The origin of the DG method for elliptic problems cannot be traced back to a single publication as features such as jump penalization in the modern sense were developed gradually. However, among the early influential contributors were Babuška, J.-L. Lions, Joachim Nitsche and Miloš Zlámal. DG methods for elliptic problems were already developed in a paper by Garth Baker in the setting of 4th order equations in 1977. A more complete account of the historical development and an introduction to DG methods for elliptic problems is given in a publication by Arnold, Brezzi, Cockburn and Marini. A number of research directions and challenges on DG methods are collected in the proceedings volume edited by Cockburn, Karniadakis and Shu.

Overview
Much like the continuous Galerkin (CG) method, the discontinuous Galerkin (DG) method is a finite element method formulated relative to a weak formulation of a particular model system.  Unlike traditional CG methods that are conforming, the DG method works over a trial space of functions that are only piecewise continuous, and thus often comprise more inclusive function spaces than the finite-dimensional inner product subspaces utilized in conforming methods.

As an example, consider the continuity equation for a scalar unknown  in a spatial domain  without "sources" or "sinks" :

 

Now consider the finite-dimensional space of discontinuous piecewise polynomial functions over the spatial domain  restricted to a discrete triangulation , written as

Then for finite element shape functions  the solution is represented by

Then similarly choosing a test function

Scalar hyperbolic conservation law 
A scalar hyperbolic conservation law is of the form

where one tries to solve for the unknown scalar function , and the functions  are typically given.

Space discretization 
The -space will be discretized as

Furthermore, we need the following definitions

Basis for function space 
We derive the basis representation for the function space of our solution .
The function space is defined as

where  denotes the restriction of  onto the interval , and  denotes the space of polynomials of maximal degree .
Note here that  is not uniquely defined at the intersection points .

At first we make use of a specific polynomial basis on the interval , the Legendre polynomials , i.e.,

Note especially the orthogonality relations 

Transformation onto the interval , and normalization is achieved by functions 

which fulfill the orthonormality relation

Transformation onto an interval  is given by 

which fulfill

For -normalization we define , and for -normalization we define , s.t.

Finally, we can define the basis representation of our solutions 

Note here, that  is not defined at the interface positions.

Besides, prism bases are employed for planar-like structures, and are capable for 2-D/3-D hybridation.

DG-scheme 
The conservation law is transformed into its weak form by multiplying with test functions, and integration over test intervals

By using partial integration one is left with

The fluxes at the interfaces are approximated by numerical fluxes  with

where  denotes the left- and right-hand sided limits.
Finally, the DG-Scheme can be written as

Scalar elliptic equation 
A scalar elliptic equation is of the form

This equation is the steady-state heat equation, where  is the temperature. Space discretization is the same as above. We recall that the interval  is partitioned into  intervals of length .

We introduce jump  and average  of functions at the node :

The interior penalty discontinuous Galerkin (IPDG) method is: find  satisfying

and

and

The penalty parameter  is a positive constant. Increasing its value will reduce the jumps in the discontinuous solution.

Direct discontinuous Galerkin method
The direct discontinuous Galerkin (DDG) method is a new discontinuous Galerkin method for solving diffusion problems. In 2009, Liu and Yan first proposed the DDG method for solving diffusion equations. The advantages of this method compared with Discontinuous Galerkin method is that the direct discontinuous Galerkin method derives the numerical format by directly taking the numerical flux of the function and the first derivative term without introducing intermediate variables. We still can get a reasonable numerical results by using this method, and the derivation process is more simple, the amount of calculation is greatly reduced.

The direct discontinuous finite element method is a branch of the Discontinuous Galerkin methods.  It mainly includes transforming the problem into variational form, regional unit splitting, constructing basis functions, forming and solving discontinuous finite element equations, and convergence and error analysis.

For example, consider a nonlinear diffusion equation, which is one-dimensional:

 , in which

Space discretization 

Also, define .

Formulation of the scheme 

Flux: .

: the exact solution of the equation.

Multiply the equation with a smooth function  so that we obtain the following equations:

,

Here  is arbitrary, the exact solution  of the equation is replaced by the approximate solution , that is to say, the numerical solution we need is obtained by solving the differential equations.

The numerical flux
Choosing a proper numerical flux is critical for the accuracy of DDG method.

The numerical flux needs to satisfy the following conditions:

♦ It is consistent with 

♦ It has the -stability;

♦ It can improve the accuracy of the method.

Thus, a general scheme for numerical flux is given:

In this flux,  is the maximum order of polynomials in two neighboring computing units.  is the jump of a function.

Error estimates

We measure the error with the following norm:

and we have ,

See also
Galerkin method

References

 D.N. Arnold, F. Brezzi, B. Cockburn and L.D. Marini, Unified analysis of discontinuous Galerkin methods for elliptic problems, SIAM J. Numer. Anal. 39(5):1749–1779, 2002.
 G. Baker, Finite element methods for elliptic equations using nonconforming elements, Math. Comp. 31 (1977), no. 137, 45–59.
 A. Cangiani, Z. Dong, E.H. Georgoulis, and P. Houston, hp-Version Discontinuous Galerkin Methods on Polygonal and Polyhedral Meshes, SpringerBriefs in Mathematics, (December 2017).
 W. Mai, J. Hu, P. Li, and H. Zhao, “An efficient and stable 2-D/3-D hybrid discontinuous Galerkin time-domain analysis with adaptive criterion for arbitrarily shaped antipads in dispersive parallel-plate pair,” IEEE Trans. Microw. Theory Techn., vol. 65, no. 10, pp. 3671–3681, Oct. 2017.
 W. Mai et al., “A straightforward updating criterion for 2-D/3-D hybrid discontinuous Galerkin time-domain method controlling comparative error,” IEEE Trans. Microw. Theory Techn., vol. 66, no. 4, pp. 1713–1722, Apr. 2018.
 B. Cockburn, G. E. Karniadakis and C.-W. Shu (eds.), Discontinuous Galerkin methods. Theory, computation and applications, Lecture Notes in Computational Science and Engineering, 11. Springer-Verlag, Berlin, 2000.
 P. Lesaint, and P. A. Raviart. "On a finite element method for solving the neutron transport equation." Mathematical aspects of finite elements in partial differential equations 33 (1974): 89–123.
 D.A. Di Pietro and A. Ern, Mathematical Aspects of Discontinuous Galerkin Methods. Mathématiques et Applications, Vol. 69, Springer-Verlag, Berlin, 2011.
 J.S. Hesthaven and T. Warburton, Nodal Discontinuous Galerkin Methods: Algorithms, Analysis, and Applications. Springer Texts in Applied Mathematics 54. Springer Verlag, New York, 2008.
 B. Rivière, Discontinuous Galerkin Methods for Solving Elliptic and Parabolic Equations: Theory and Implementation. SIAM Frontiers in Applied Mathematics, 2008.
 CFD Wiki http://www.cfd-online.com/Wiki/Discontinuous_Galerkin
 W.H. Reed and T.R. Hill, Triangular mesh methods for the neutron transport equation, Tech. Report LA-UR-73–479, Los Alamos Scientific Laboratory, 1973.

Numerical differential equations
Partial differential equations
Finite element method